American(s) may refer to:
 American, something of, from, or related to the United States of America, commonly known as the "United States" or "America"
 Americans, citizens and nationals of the United States of America
 American ancestry, people who self-identify their ancestry as "American"
 American English, the set of varieties of the English language native to the United States
 Native Americans in the United States, indigenous peoples of the United States
 American, something of, from, or related to the Americas, also known as "America"
 Indigenous peoples of the Americas
 American (word), for analysis and history of the meanings in various contexts

Organizations
 American Airlines, U.S.-based airline headquartered in Fort Worth, Texas
 American Athletic Conference, an American college athletic conference
 American Recordings (record label), a record label that was previously known as Def American
 American University, in Washington, D.C.

Sports teams

Soccer
 Baltimore Americans, the name of two soccer teams, one from 1939 to 1942 and one from 1942 to 1948
 Chicago Americans, a soccer team in 1972
 Dallas Americans, a soccer team from 1983 to 1985
 Hartford Americans, a soccer team from 1927 to 1928
 Miami Americans, a reincarnation of the New Jersey Americans in 1980
 New Jersey Americans (soccer), a soccer team from 1976 to 1979
 New York Americans (soccer), a soccer team from 1931 to 1956
 Uhrik Truckers, a soccer team known from 1941 to 1953 as the Philadelphia Americans

Hockey
 Allen Americans, a minor league hockey team
 New York Americans, an ice hockey team from 1925 to 1942
 Rochester Americans, a minor league ice hockey franchise in the American Hockey League (AHL)
 Seattle Totems, an ice hockey team known from 1955 to 1958 as the Seattle Americans
 Tri-City Americans, a junior ice hockey team

Baseball 
 Boston Red Sox, a baseball team known from 1901 until 1907 as the Boston Americans
 Nashville Americans, an 1885–1886 minor league baseball team
 American League, a professional baseball league organized in 1901
 American Association (disambiguation), a name used by several professional baseball leagues

Basketball 
 Brooklyn Nets, a basketball team known in the 1960s as the New York Americans and New Jersey Americans
 Oakland Oaks (ABA), a basketball team known briefly in 1967 as the Oakland Americans

American football 
 Pittsburgh Americans, an American football team from 1936 until 1937
 New York Yankees (1940 AFL), an American football team known as the New York Americans in 1941

Vehicles
 American (1899 automobile), by American Automobile Company, New York City
 American (1902 automobile), by American Motor Carriage Company, Cleveland
 American (1911 automobile), by American Automobile Manufacturing Company founded in Missouri
 American (1914 automobile), by American Cyclecar Company, Michigan
 American (1917 automobile), built in New Jersey
 American Motors Corporation (AMC), automobile manufacturing company (1954–1988)
 Rambler American, a compact line of cars by American Motors Corporation (1958–1969)
 USS American, several ships of the US Navy
 4-4-0, a classification of railway locomotive described as the American type

Music
 American (album), a 2017 studio album by RuPaul
 "American", a song by Fish Karma
 "American" (Lana Del Rey song), 2012
 AmericanEP, an extended play album by English electronica duo The Chemical Brothers
 American Quartet (Dvořák), a string quartet by Antonín Dvořák

Other uses
 Americana (culture), artifacts related to the history of the United States
 American cheese, a type of processed cheese
 American McGee (born 1972), American video game designer
 American Canyon, a city in Northern California

See also
 
 
 America (disambiguation)
 Armorican (disambiguation)
 The American (disambiguation)
 The Americans (disambiguation)
 List of automobile manufacturers of the United States
 American Made (disambiguation)
 Pan-American (disambiguation)
 Pro-American (disambiguation)
 Anti-American

Language and nationality disambiguation pages